Las Maravillas is a census-designated place in Valencia County, New Mexico, United States. Its population was 1,628 as of the 2010 census.

Geography
Las Maravillas is located at coordinates . According to the United States Census Bureau, Las Maravillas has a total area of 2.65 square kilometers, of which 2.64 km is land and 0.01 km is water.

Demographics

According to the 2010 census, 1628 people were living in Las Maravillas. The population density was 615.04 inhabitants per km. Of the 1628 inhabitants, Las Maravillas was composed by 79.48% White, 1.04% were African American, 2.33% were Native American, 0.61% were Asian, 0.31% were Pacific Islanders, 11.3% were of other races and 4.91% from two or more races. Of the total population 47.79% were Hispanic or Latino of any race.

Education
The majority of Las Maravillas is in Los Lunas Public Schools, while a portion is in Belen Consolidated Schools. Belén High School is the Belén district's comprehensive high school.

References

Census-designated places in New Mexico
Census-designated places in Valencia County, New Mexico